Trinity Anglican School (TAS) is an Independent Anglican School in Far North Queensland, Australia which opened on 25 May 1983. It has three campuses set over two grounds. TAS White Rock caters for students from Kindergarten through to Year 12, and TAS Kewarra Beach serves students from Kindergarten to Year 6.

In 2015, TAS White Rock opened the Science Technology Engineering Mathematics (STEM) building (S-Block) designed by Charles Wright Architects, for students in Years 7 to 12. The White Rock campus' also have the first Olympic-sized swimming pool in Cairns, completed in 2000. TAS White Rock is currently undergoing a comprehensive renovation programme of the older classrooms to bring it into line with that of the recent Science Block.

Students who have completed their studies at TAS from Preparatory to Year 12 are regarded as Trinitarians by the school for their dedication and commitment to the school community over 13 years.

The motto of the school is, .

Trinity Anglican School, in a tradition common to many schools in Britain and Commonwealth countries, has a house system that groups students across age- and academic-levels for certain co-curricular activities. Cultural, academic, and sporting activities are, in-part, chanelled and encouraged through house involvement, and achievement rewarded by group recognition. The four houses of TAS and their corresponding colours are, Leichhardt - yellow / gold; Mulligan - red; Kennedy - green; and Dalrymple - blue. They are named after four prominent explorers who were active in North Queensland during European colonisation: Ludwig Leichhardt, James Venture Mulligan, Edmund Kennedy and George Elphinstone Dalrymple.

See also 
 List of schools in Far North Queensland

References

External links 
 Trinity Anglican School

Anglican schools in Queensland
Educational institutions established in 1983
Schools in Cairns
High schools in Queensland
Round Square schools
Junior School Heads Association of Australia Member Schools
1983 establishments in Australia